The 2022 Shelbourne F.C. (women) season saw Shelbourne retain the Women's National League title for a second season and complete a double by winning the FAI Women's Cup.

First team squad

 Players' ages are as of the opening day of the 2022 season.

Transfers

Transfers in

Loans in

Transfers out

Competitions

Overview

Women's National League

Results summary

Results by matchday

Matches

FAI Cup

Matches

UEFA Women's Champions League

Matches

Statistics

Appearances and goals

 Players listed in italics left the club mid-season
Source: RedsStats1895

Goalscorers 
As of match played 6 November 2022

Players listed in italics left the club mid-season
Source: RedsStats1985

Kit

The 2022 home shirt was released on 10 December 2021.

|
|

References

External links

Shelbourne F.C. seasons